Sugarloaf, Queensland may refer to:

 Sugarloaf, Queensland (Southern Downs Region), a locality on the Darling Downs, Australia
 Sugarloaf, Queensland (Whitsunday Region), a locality on the north-eastern coast, Australia